At least three ships of the French Navy have been named Valmy:

 , a 120-gun ship of the line launched in 1847, renamed Borda in 1863 and again renamed as Intrépide in 1890. She was scrapped in 1891.
 , a Jemmapes-class coast defence ship, launched in April 1892 and scrapped after 1911.
 , a  launched in 1928 and scuttled in 1942.

French Navy ship names